Sel or Nord-Sel is a village in Sel Municipality in Innlandet county, Norway. The European route E6 highway runs past the village on the opposite side of the river, and there is a short bridge connecting the village to this highway. The Nord-Sel Church is located in the village, right along the river.

Since 2016, the population and area data for this village area has not been separately tracked by Statistics Norway.

References

Sel
Villages in Innlandet